Girish Rao Hatwar, popularly known as Jogi, is a Kannada writer and journalist. Being one of the Kannada neo-literature writers, he has written short stories, novels and columns in many Kannada periodicals and daily newspapers. He has also written scripts for television serials, lyrics and screen play for movies. A journalist by profession, Jogi is currently a Magazine Editor of Kannada Prabha daily.

Early life
Born in an agricultural family in Hosabettu near Suratkal in Mangaluru district, Jogi studied in Guruvayankere and Uppinangadi. Elder brother Hatwar Narayana Rao made name in Karnataka rural folk world by writing Yakshagana episodes and as a narrator in Thala Maddale.

Jogi, who started writing at the age of 18, completed his B.Com. in Puttur. In 1989, as Girish Rao Hatwar, he came to Bangalore and was transformed as Jogi by the then editor of Kannada Prabha – Y N Krishnamurthy, popularly known as YNK.

Career 
Jogi started by writing a column Bollywood 'Gha'sip in Kannada Prabha. He wrote a column called Ravi Kanaddu in Hi Bangalore, a Kannada weekly and later joined as its assistant editor. Jogi worked as editor of a monthly magazine Acchari. Jogi, Janaki, Girish Rao Hatwar, H Girish Rao, Sathyavratha Hosabeettu were some of his pen names and later worked as Associate Magazine Editor in Kannada Prabha. He gained popularity as movie and book reviewer and slowly started writing stories. Later, he started writing novels also.

Jogi wrote a series for young adults. Titled as Life is beautiful, six books have been published under this series. His novel Ashwatthaman, which has a film actor as central character, has received positive reviews.

Along with journalism and literature activities, Jogi wrote dialogues to Kannada television serials. Jogi wrote the script and dialogue of the movie Mouni, which is based on a novel by U. R. Ananthamurthy. Kaada Beladingalu written by Jogi was adapted as a movie and it bagged Karnataka State Film Awards 2006-07 in the categories of best social film and best story.

Jogi's stories were published in Mayura, Taranga, Tushara, Sudha, O Manase magazines, as well as Kannada Prabha and Prajavani newspapers. He also wrote Essays to Lankesh Patrike in the name of H Girish. He used to write book reviews under pseudo names and was also in charge of Roopatara being published under Manipal group. As of 2022, he is working as Chief Magazine Editor of Kannada Prabha.

Jogi has started a literary group Half Circle in Club House.

Bibliography

Novels
 Nadiya Nenapina Hangu
 Yamini
 Chitte Hejje Jadu
 Hit Wicket
 Urmila
 Maya Kinnari
 Guruvayanakere
 Devara Hucchu
 Chikkappa
 Chaithra Vaishaka Vasantha
 Ellanu Maduvudu Hottegagi
 VirahadaSankshiptaPadakosha
 L
 Ashwatthaman

Bengaluru Series 

 Bengaluru
 Salam Bengaluru
 B Capital
 Ulida Vivaragalu Labhyavilla
 Mahanagara
 Puchche

Story collections 
 SeeluNalige
 Jogi Kathegalu
 Kadu Hadiya Kathegalu
 Rayabhagada Rahasya Rathri
 Jarasandha
 Sufi Kathegalu
 Katha Samaya
 Facebook Dot Com – Manasa Joshi
 Nale Baa
 Ondanondu Ooralli
 108- Naki Dashakada kathegalu
 Kathe Pustaka

Columns
 Bollywood 'Gha'sip
 Ravi Kanaddu – Ravi Kandaddu
 Janaki column 
 Jogimane
 Roopa Rekhe
 Secret Diary
 Note Book
 Are Belaku
 AnkanaGaliAata
 MasalaDosege KempuChatney
 Sahaja Khushi
 Janaki with Love

Inspirational books
 Life is Beautiful
 Thande Thayi Devaralla
 Devarannu Nambabedi
 Preethisuvavarannu Kondubidi
 Nanu Badava Nanu Sukhi
 I hate my wife
 Avaru Ivaru Devaru
 Saavu (The art Of dying)

Play
 Vishwamitra Menake Dance MadoduEnakke
 SubitreBanna Ba bitre Sunna (NeenasamThirugata 2017)

Variety writings
 M Rangarao (personality)
 SadashivaAvara Aida Kathegalu (Edited)
 Jogi Reader (Audio collections of Jogi writings – Compiled by Sandhya Rani)
 Mathu, Mouna, Dhyana, Vishnuvardhana – A journalist's perception (Sep 2018)

Others
 Halage – Balapa (Lessons for new writers)
 Kathe, Chitrakathe, Sambhashane (Along with articles from 18 film directors)
 Edited a tributary under the name Bahuroopi Karnad post Karnad's demise; This is a collection of 37 articles by the who's who of Indian arts and literature

Awards and recognition
 Karnataka State Award for Best Story for Film Kada Beladingalu
 Vaddarse Raghuram Shetty Award for Journalism
 Bangalore Literature Festival Book Prize for achievements in Kannada Literature, 2021
 Sahithya Rathna
 Sahityashri Award, Karnataka Sahitya Academy, 2021

References

External links 
 Jogi Girish Rao Hatwar, Book Brahma
 Jogi, Mylang

Kannada-language writers
1965 births
Living people